Gandhara serva is a moth of the family Erebidae first described by Francis Walker in 1854. It is found in the Himalayas and possibly Thailand.

References

Moths described in 1854
Lithosiina